Sir Clarence Henry Augustus Seignoret  (25 February 1919 – 5 May 2002) was the third President of Dominica.

Biography
Born in Roseau, Seignoret was educated at the Dominica Grammar School and at college in Saint Lucia before he started working as a civil servant in Dominica from 1936. From 1958 to 1960 he undertook an international public service course in Oxford University. On returning to Dominica he resumed his governmental career, acting on various occasions as first Secretary to the Cabinet and substitute to the President.  

The House of Assembly of Dominica elected him as President of Dominica in 1983, and he was sworn in during October of that year. Re-elected to the presidency in 1988, he resigned in 1993.

In the 1966 New Year Honours, Elizabeth II appointed him an Officer of the Order of the British Empire (OBE) and in 1985 he was knighted with the Grand Cross of the Order of the Bath. He was also Knight of Malta since 1992.

References

 Biography

  

Knights Grand Cross of the Order of the Bath
Officers of the Order of the British Empire
Presidents of Dominica
2002 deaths
1919 births
Alumni of the University of Oxford